Midi 20 is the first studio album from Grand Corps Malade. The album sold over 600,000 copies.

Track listing

 "Le jour se lève"
 "Saint-Denis"
 "Je dors sur mes 2 oreilles"
 "Midi 20"
 "Ça peut chémar" (duet with John Pucc'Chocolat)
 "6ème sens"
 "Je connaissais pas Paris le matin"
 "Chercheur de phases"
 "Parole du bout du monde" (duet with Rouda)
 "Attentat verbal"
 "Les voyages en train"
 "J'ai oublié"
 "Vu de ma fenêtre"
 "Rencontres"
 "Ma tête, mon coeur et mes couilles"
 "Toucher l'instant"

Personnel
Production: Jean-Rachid for Anouche Productions
Artistic director: S Petit Nico
Sound engineer / Mixing: Nico (staf) Stawski
Music by: S Petit Nico (tracks 1, 3, 5, 6, 8, 9, 11, 12, 13, 14, 16),  Baptiste Charvet (track 4)

Charts

Weekly charts

Year-end charts

Awards
Grand Corps Malade earned two Victoires de la musique awards for "Album révélation of the year" and "Artist stage révélation of the year" in 2007 for his work on album Midi 20

References

2006 debut albums
Grand Corps Malade albums